Battle of Point Pedro may refer to:

Battle of Point Pedro (2006)
Battle of Point Pedro (2007)